Koronouda (old name:  Arbor / Arbouro) is the small village in the Kilkis regional unit, Northern Greece. Its population was 145 in 2011.

References 

Populated places in Kilkis (regional unit)